Caradon may refer to:
 Caradon - a local government district in Cornwall, United Kingdom.
 Caradon Hill - a geographic location in Cornwall, United Kingdom.
 Caradon Hill transmitting station - a telecommunications facility on Caradon Hill.
 Caradon plc - the company founded in 1985 that merged with Metal Box, and eventually became Novar plc, which itself was taken over by Honeywell in 2005.
 Hugh Foot, Baron Caradon - the British politician (Lord Caradon from 1964).